Scad may refer to:

Science, technology, and health care
 Acronym "SCAD"
 Spontaneous coronary artery dissection
 Stable coronary artery disease (stable ischemic heart disease) (see Coronary artery disease § Stable angina)
 Segmental colitis associated with diverticulosis, a type of colitis
 Scad, name for various fish in the jack family, Carangidae
 the common name of the genus Alepes
 Herring scad, a species of tropical marine fish in this genus
 Razorbelly scad
 Smallmouth scad
 the common name of the jackfish genus Decapterus
 Round scad
 ".scad" file format used by OpenSCAD

Sport
 Suspended Catch Air Device, a variety of bungee jumping

Other
 Savannah College of Art and Design, a university in the United States
 Security Council Affairs Division, part of the Department of Political and Peacebuilding Affairs of the United Nations